The Tiburon Challenger is a professional tennis tournament played on outdoor hard courts. It is currently part of the ATP Challenger Tour. It has been held annually at the Tiburon Peninsula Club in Tiburon, California, United States, since 2003.

Past finals

Singles

Doubles

External links
Official Website

 
ATP Challenger Tour
Hard court tennis tournaments in the United States
Sports in Marin County, California
Tennis tournaments in California